The 2015–16 Melbourne Renegades WBBL season was the inaugural in the team's history. Coached by Lachlan Stevens and captained by Sarah Elliott, they competed in the WBBL's 2015–16 season.

Fixtures

Regular season

Ladder

Squad
Each WBBL|01 squad featured 14 active players, with an allowance of up to five marquee signings including a maximum of three from overseas. Australian marquees are defined as players who made at least ten limited-overs appearances for the national team between 1 July 2012 and 1 July 2015. The table below lists the Renegades players and their key stats (including runs scored, batting strike rate, wickets taken, economy rate, catches and stumpings) for the season.

References

2015–16 Women's Big Bash League season
Melbourne Renegades (WBBL)